The Limpopo-Lipadi Game and Wilderness Reserve is a large, privately owned game reserve in Botswana which sells shares of that reserve to the public.

References

External links 
 Official Website

Geography of Botswana
Game reserves